Vranovice-Kelčice is a municipality in Prostějov District in the Olomouc Region of the Czech Republic. It has about 600 inhabitants.

Administrative parts
The municipality is made up of villages of Vranovice and Kelčice.

History
The first written mention of Kelčice is from 1258. The first written mention of Vranovice is from 1337. The two formerly separate municipalities merged in 1964.

References

External links

Villages in Prostějov District